Ponthus Westerholm (born 6 January 1992) is a Swedish ice hockey player. He is currently playing with Malmö Redhawks of the Swedish Hockey League.

Playing career
Westerholm made his Swedish Hockey League debut playing with Brynäs IF during the 2014–15 SHL season. Ponthus' twin brother Pathrik is also a professional hockey player.

On 3 May 2017, Westerholm left Brynäs alongside brother Pathrik, and signed a two-year contract with Frölunda HC.

After claiming the Swedish Championship in his final season under contract in 2018–19 season, Westerholm left as a free agent to move to the Finnish Liiga, again alongside Pathrik, agreeing to a one-year deal with Lukko on May 8, 2019.

Awards and honours

References

External links

1992 births
Brynäs IF players
BIK Karlskoga players
Frölunda HC players
Living people
Malmö Redhawks players
Swedish ice hockey right wingers
People from Karlskrona
Sportspeople from Blekinge County